Kuttanpillayude Sivarathri (English: Kuttanpilla's Sivarathri) is a 2018 Indian Malayalam-language horror comedy film directed by Jean Markose and produced by Raji Nandakumar through production studio Alanghat Productions. The film set in the backdrop of Puttingal temple fire. The film stars Suraj Venjaramoodu, Mithun Ramesh and Biju Sopanam in the lead roles. Other co-lead roles are done by Asha Sreekanth, Srinda Arhaan, Ramya Suresh, Radio Presenter Dr.Shruthy Muralidharan and popular percussionist Shilpa Sreekumar. The movie also marks playback singer Sayanora Philip's debut music directorial. Fazil Nassar is the cinematographer and Shibish K Chandran is the editor.

Plot
Plachottil Kuttan Pillai is a strong-willed policeman who lives a contented life with his wife, Sub-Inspector Shakunthala, looking after his backyard farm. They have three children, all married and settled. A party of his relatives - his children, their spouses and the extended family - converge at his humble home to attend the annual Shivarathri festival attached to the famous Shiva Temple in the neighbourhood. Yet, the festive mood is soon embroiled with selfish objectives of the sons-in-law, blowing off Pillai's peaceful domestic life. One of his son-in-law, Suneesh, intends to cut down a huge jackfruit tree in Kuttan Pillai's backyard to make furniture for his new house, but Kuttan Pillai protests. Suneesh fights Kuttan Pillai and he leaves the house along with his wife Rajani and children. The next day, Kuttan Pillai dies when a jackfruit falls onto him while taking a stroll around his backyard. He becomes a ghost and, along with some other ghosts, watches what is going to happen in his house after his death. Meanwhile, Kuttan Pillai learns that the other ghosts died in the Puttingal Temple Fire accident, which occurred on Shivarathri day. Suneesh tries to cut the tree soon after Kuttan Pillai's funeral, much to the worry of his apparition. However, Shakunthala stops him from doing so with a stern warning, leaving behind a happy Kuttan Pillai.

Cast 
 Suraj Venjaramoodu as Plachottil Kuttan Pillai
 Mithun Ramesh as Sachin Vaykundam
 Biju Sopanam as Suneesh
 Asha Madathil Sreekanth as Shakuntala Kuttan Pillai
 Srinda Arhaan as Rajani 
 Dain Davis as Vishakan
 Vinimol Viswambharan as Premalatha
 Remya Suresh as Raji
 Shruthy Muralidharan as Sushama
 Kumar Sethu as Susheelan
 Srikanth Murali as Fr. Rodruigez
 Kochu Preman as Fr. Joseph Puthanpurakkal 
 Poojappura Radhakrishnan as Aashaan 
 Praveen Ram as Ganeshan
 Swathi Thara as Lathika
 Pinku Plakkadu as Hareendran
 Rajesh Manarkad as Karmi 
 James Eliyas as Driver
 Kothanath Kochammalu Amma as Suraj's Ammayi
 Shilpa Sreekumar as Shalini 
 Rinsa Jacob as Asma
 Praveen Menon as Gopan
 Karishma Ganglani as Arabic woman
 Mufaz as Arabic woman's lover
 Jibin V Das as Villager

Awards

References

External links
 

2018 films
2010s Malayalam-language films
Films shot in Kollam
Indian drama films